1981 Soviet Second League was a Soviet competition in the Soviet Second League.

Qualifying groups

Group I [Russian Federation]

Group II [Russian Federation]

Group III [Russian Federation]

Group IV [Russian Federation]

Group V [Ukraine]

Group VI (Central Asia)

Group VII [Kazakhstan]

Group VIII (Soviet Republics)
 For places 1-4

Group IX (Caucasus)
 For places 1-8

Final group stage
 [Oct 26 – Nov 12]

Group A

Group B

Group C

References
 All-Soviet Archive Site
 Results. RSSSF

Soviet Second League seasons
3
Soviet
Soviet